Manny Collins (born August 2, 1984) is a former American football cornerback. He was signed by the New York Jets as an undrafted free agent in 2007. He played college football at Rutgers.

Early years
Collins played high school football at Plainfield High School.

References

External links
Just Sports Stats

1984 births
Living people
Plainfield High School (New Jersey) alumni
Players of American football from New Jersey
Sportspeople from Plainfield, New Jersey
American football cornerbacks
Rutgers Scarlet Knights football players
New York Jets players
Hartford Colonials players
Sacramento Mountain Lions players